Alastair Dunbar Storey OBE (born January 1953) is a Scottish businessman. He is the chairman and CEO of Westbury Street Holdings (WSH), a contract catering company, which he founded in 2000.

Early life
Storey was born in January 1953, in the village of Fyvie, Aberdeenshire, the son of a chartered accountant father who retired at 86. He was educated at Robert Gordon's College in Aberdeen, followed by a bachelor's degree in hospitality and catering management at Strathclyde University, although he originally wanted to go to art school.

Career
In 1975, Storey joined P&O's Sutcliffe Catering Services as a trainee manager, rising to managing director of Sutcliffe Catering South East. In 1993, Granada bought Sutcliffe, and then Forte in 1996, and Storey became managing director of the newly formed Granada Food Services division.

In 2000, Storey formed Wilson Storey with Keith Wilson, his former finance director, and after further mergers and acquisitions, Wilson Storey Halliday merged with BaxterSmith to become BaxterStorey in 2004.

In 2012, Storey was ranked first in the Caterer and Hotelkeeper 100 list of the most influential people in the British hospitality industry, ending celebrity chef Jamie Oliver's two years at number one, and the first time the top position was given to someone in contract catering.

WSH owns BaxterStorey, Portico, Caterlink, Holroyd Howe, Benugo and Searcys, and its headquarters, WSH International Investments Limited, is in Reading, Berkshire.

In 2016, Storey was appointed president of the Institute of Hospitality.

Storey was appointed Officer of the Order of the British Empire (OBE) in the 2017 Birthday Honours for services to the hospitality industry.

Personal life
Storey is married to Liz, whom he met at university. They have five children.
He is a big Formula 1 motor racing fan, and took up skiing at the age of 50.

Arms
Storey matriculated arms in 2018.

References

1953 births
Alumni of the University of Strathclyde
Scottish businesspeople
Scottish chief executives
People educated at Robert Gordon's College
Living people
People from Aberdeenshire
Officers of the Order of the British Empire